Gesher (lit. Bridge) may refer to:

Gesher (2019 political party), an active political party from Israel
Gesher (political party), a defunct political party from Israel
Gesher Theater, a theater in Tel-Aviv
Gesher – Zionist Religious Centre, defunct political party from Israel in the early 1980s
Gesher, Israel, a kibbutz in Israel
Camp Gesher, a Habonim-Dror summer camp in Cloyne, Ontario
 Gesher, the former codename of the Intel Sandy Bridge microprocessor architecture
Gesher (archaeological site), an archaeological site in Israel